Tim Kelleher may refer to:
 Tim Kelleher (actor), American actor
 Tim Kelleher (musician) (born 1980), American musician

See also
Timothy Keller (disambiguation)